Chris Riehm (April 14, 1961 – March 11, 2012) was an American football guard and tackle. He played for the Los Angeles Raiders from 1986 to 1988.

He died of a heart attack on March 11, 2012, in Medina, Ohio at age 50.

References

1961 births
2012 deaths
American football offensive guards
American football offensive tackles
Ohio State Buckeyes football players
Los Angeles Raiders players